The Global Warming Tour, by American hard rock band Aerosmith, included 82 concert performances across North America, Oceania, Asia, Latin America, and Europe. 

"It's something so magical," remarked Steven Tyler. "Other people see it. We don't, because we're in the middle of it. This is Aerosmith, man. The second we get up there on stage, it's insane."

Prior to the first leg, the band played a private event for Walmart shareholders. The first leg included 23 performances and lasted from late May through early August 2012.

The second leg included 14 performances in November and December 2012. Before the second leg, the band performed a brief set at the iHeartRadio Music Festival in mid September. Also prior to the second leg, to promote their new album in early November, the band played three nationally televised performances in New York City and did a special performance in front of their old Boston apartment. 

The first two legs were held primarily in indoor arenas, with a couple outdoor shows and a few festivals on the first leg, including three in eastern Canada and Milwaukee's Summerfest.

The third leg of the tour ran from late April to mid May 2013 and saw Aerosmith playing their first shows in Australia since 1990, as well as their first shows in New Zealand and the Philippines. On May 30, the band played at the "Boston Strong" charity concert for victims of the Boston Marathon bombing. In July 2013, the band played at the Greenbrier Classic in West Virginia and at Foxwoods Resort Casino in Connecticut. In August 2013, the band performed four concerts in Japan, but their first shows in China and Taiwan were cancelled due to poor ticket sales. The band performed in August at the Harley-Davidson 110th anniversary concert series in Milwaukee. Concerts were planned for Latin America in September and October, including their first shows in Uruguay, Guatemala and El Salvador.

Cheap Trick opened all dates on the first two legs bar a few festivals. The Dead Dasies, featuring Jon Stevens and Richard Fortus, opened the Australia/New Zealand leg. In Argentina and Brazil, Aerosmith toured with Whitesnake, including the Personal Fest in Buenos Aires and at the Monsters of Rock in São Paulo.

The tour promoted Music from Another Dimension!, released on November 6, 2012. In addition to hits and choice album cuts, the band performed four new songs from the album, three of them regularly ("Oh Yeah", "Legendary Child", and "Lover Alot").

On May 5, 2013, the band announced they had cancelled their first show in Jakarta due to safety concerns.

In 2014, Aerosmith played 17 concerts across Europe from May 14 to July 2. The Let Rock Rule Tour was scheduled to follow in July, August, and September 2014 and see Aerosmith play several dates in North America. This tour featured Slash (with Myles Kennedy and the Conspirators) as the opening act. Full details of the tour were announced on April 8, 2014. On May 14, 2014, the band announced that they had cancelled their concert in Istanbul after Turkey declared a three-day mourning for the victims of Soma mine disaster. July 2, 2014 concert in Kyiv was cancelled due to civil unrest in Ukraine.

Stage setup
The stage was very close to the design of past tours. The main stage, occupying one end of the venue had the classic Aerosmith logo painted on top and two small platforms off to each side. Kramer's drums were at the back, Hamilton and Whitford were on the left side, and Perry was on the right side. The back-up musicians were at the back-left of the stage behind a stack of amps, the order usually went Melanie Taylor (backing vocals), Mindi Abair (saxophone and backing vocals) and Russ Irwin (keyboards and backing vocals). In the middle of the main stage was the catwalk, which ran through nine rows at each venue. At the end of the catwalk was a B-stage, which ran through the tenth row to the sixteenth row. Around the entire stage was a half-meter wide barricade that contained security and a few select fans.

Performance
The show would start with a video playing on the main video screen that was reminiscent of the original opening from The Outer Limits. Near the end of the video, smoke would arise from the end of the B-stage and from the main stage. When the video finished, Kramer, Whitford and Hamilton would kick into the opening song while Tyler and Perry would rise from a trapdoor at the end of the B-stage. For the first song, Tyler and Perry would stay on the B-stage and the rest of the band would stay on the main stage. After the first song finished, Hamilton, Whitford, Tyler and Perry would all go where they pleased. At "What It Takes", Tyler would look for an attractive girl to sing the opening lines, like in most tours. At the encore which was "Dream On" at every date, smoke would again appear from the end of the B-stage and Tyler on a white piano would appear from the same trapdoor as before. The piano had a few blocks beside it used as stairs by Perry and Tyler, as they would walk on top of the piano. They followed with a second encore – "Train Kept A-Rollin'" – and at a few venues, a third encore was even played, either "Mama Kin" or "Chip Away the Stone". When the encores wrapped up, a few cannons fired silver confetti into the audience. After the confetti storm, Tyler would introduce the back-up musicians (Taylor, Abair and Irwin) and the members of Aerosmith. Finally, he would hand the microphone off to Perry, who would introduce Tyler. After the introductions, the band would walk out with "Mannish Boy" by Muddy Waters playing over the speakers.

Top 200 North American Tours 2012: #23
Total Gross: US $31 million
Total Attendance: 306,475 (33 concerts)

Tour dates

Notes

Trivia
Aerosmith premiered six new songs on this tour: "Oh Yeah", "Legendary Child", "What Could Have Been Love", "Lover Alot", "Freedom Fighter" and, in excerpted form only, "Street Jesus".
Whitford's sons Harrison and Graham guested on "Last Child" at, respectively, the American Airlines Center in Dallas and Madison Square Garden in New York City.
At the Hollywood Bowl, instead of Tyler and Perry appearing from a trapdoor at the end of the catwalk, Stan Lee introduced the band and Aerosmith simply walked onstage.
Actor Johnny Depp played rhythm guitar and one solo on "Train Kept A-Rollin'" in Los Angeles at the Hollywood Bowl, and guested on "Come Together" and "Stop Messin' Around" at the Staples Center.
Sean Lennon, son of John, added vocals on "Come Together" at Madison Square Garden in New York City. 
"Lick and a Promise" got its first play in 24 years on United States soil, the last time being at the Pacific Coast Amphitheater in Costa Mesa on September 15, 1988, on the Permanent Vacation Tour.
Aerosmith performed a clip of "Woman of the World" in Atlanta at the Phillips Center. The song hadn't been played anywhere since 1974.
Aerosmith had to reschedule their show in Bristow, Virginia, because of reported voice problems by Tyler. Originally scheduled for July 3, it was moved to August 12. A difficult political situation in Ukraine meant the show in Kyiv was moved from May 21 to July 2, 2014.
Jesse Sky Kramer joined his father on percussion for many songs at every show.
This is the first tour where Aerosmith utilised back-up singers other than Russ Irwin.
Tyler joined Kramer on drums during "Combination" at every date.
At a few shows, saxophonist and back-up singer Mindi Abair jammed with Kramer during his drum solo.
On some nights Whitford played guitar and provided backing vocals on "Ain't That a Shame" or "Surrender" with opening act Cheap Trick. On other nights, Tyler would run out during "I Want You to Want Me", play with Trick bassist Tom Petersson and guitarist Rick Nielsen, help sing the chorus, then quickly exit.
Former Guns N' Roses guitarist Izzy Stradlin guested on "Mama Kin" at the Staples Center in Los Angeles.
Russ Irwin, Aerosmith keyboardist, occasionally performed the "Abbey Road Medley" (originally by The Beatles) with Cheap Trick during their set.
At the Sunrise, Florida, show on 12/09, longtime Aerosmith collaborator Richie Supa guested on "Chip Away the Stone".
On the 11/27 Toronto show, Aerosmith performed "Red House" as an homage to Jimi Hendrix on what would have been his seventieth birthday.
Before the Melbourne show, Hamilton suffered a chest infection and was flown home. David Hull from the Joe Perry Project was flown in from the United States to play in his place. Hamilton was set to return with the band after the Australian dates.
"Throughout tonight's two-hour show," noted Classic Rock of June 27's Toronto fixture, "the singer heaps generous praise on his bandmates, and name-checks (rather than hip-checks) Perry so many times that it borders on idolatry… Intoxicating stuff."

List of songs played

Setlist

Personnel
Aerosmith
Steven Tyler – lead vocals, harmonica, percussion, piano
Joe Perry – guitar, backing vocals, lead vocals, pedal steel guitar, talkbox
Brad Whitford – guitar
Tom Hamilton – bass
Joey Kramer – drums, percussion
Additional musicians
Russ Irwin – keyboards, backing vocals, percussion, guitar (until 2014-04-08)
Mindi Abair – saxophones (First leg)
Melanie Taylor – backing vocals, percussion (First leg)
Jesse Sky Kramer – percussion
David Hull – bass (after Tom leaves due to sickness)
Buck Johnson – keyboards, backing vocals (after Russ Irwin quits the band beginning on 2014-05-17)

References

2012 concert tours
2013 concert tours
2014 concert tours
Aerosmith concert tours